Safonovka is a rural locality (a selo) in Duvansky Selsoviet, Duvansky District, Bashkortostan, Russia. The population was 42 as of 2010. There is 1 street.

Geography 
Safonovka is located 78 km west of Mesyagutovo (the district's administrative centre) by road. Burtsevka is the nearest rural locality.

References 

Rural localities in Duvansky District